Angus McLagan (1891 – 4 September 1956) was a New Zealand politician of the Labour Party. He was a member of the Legislative Council and later Member of Parliament for Riccarton. He was a cabinet minister from 1942 to 1949 in the First Labour Government.

Biography

Early life and career
McLagan was born in the Scottish village of Mid Calder, Midlothian, and left school at fourteen to work in the West Calder mines. He emigrated to New Zealand in 1911 and settled in Greymouth. He worked in the Grey Valley mines before briefly moving to Brunner, but he moved back to Greymouth in 1938. In 1940 he shifted again to Rangiora before finally moving to Christchurch in 1947.

He was an active trade unionist all his life. In 1927 he was elected as the first Secretary of the United Mine Workers of New Zealand, holding the position until 1935. In 1937 he was elected as the inaugural President of the New Zealand Federation of Labour (FOL) until 1946 when he resigned.

Political career

His political career began in local-body politics. He was a member of both the Greymouth Borough Council and Brunner Borough Council.

McLagan was appointed to the Legislative Council in 1942 by Prime Minister Peter Fraser until he resigned from it in 1946 to contest a seat in the lower house. From 1944 to 1947 he was Leader of the Legislative Council. During World War II, from 1942 to 1946, he was Minister of National Service and Minister of Industrial Manpower.

Following his resignation from the Legislative Council he was elected to the House of Representatives as member for the Riccarton electorate from the 1946 general election to 1956, when he died. Following the 1946 election he was appointed by Fraser as Minister of Labour, Minister of Immigration, Minister of Employment and Minister of Mines.

Following Labour's defeat at the 1949 general election he was a member of the opposition frontbench under first Fraser and later Walter Nash. In 1951 he was nominated to stand for the deputy leadership of the party, but he declined the nomination.

A dour, squarely-built Scot, he was self-educated and well-read, and could write shorthand (which was useful in demolishing the speeches of opponents). He was grim and aloft; his speeches were cold, logical and often bitter; and some civil servants and others thought he had the best brain in Cabinet.

Death
McLagan was hospitalised in early August 1956 with a chest complaint. He died on 4 September 1956, survived by his wife, two sons and two daughters.

Family
McLagan was married to Sophie McLagan (her second marriage). They had two daughters (Cissie Agnes McLagan, Margaret Bridget McLagan) and two sons (Angus and John Campbell (Jock) McLagan).

Notes

References

|-

|-

1891 births
1956 deaths
Local politicians in New Zealand
New Zealand Labour Party MPs
Members of the Cabinet of New Zealand
Members of the New Zealand Legislative Council
New Zealand Labour Party MLCs
New Zealand MPs for Christchurch electorates
Members of the New Zealand House of Representatives
Scottish emigrants to New Zealand
People from West Lothian
20th-century New Zealand politicians